Lucius Fulvius Curvus was an aristocrat of the middle Roman Republic and consul prior in 322 BC with Quintus Fabius Maximus Rullianus. He is the first of the gens Fulvia documented in the history of Rome.

According to his filiation, his father and grandfather's names were also Lucius.

Fulvius Curius is said to have been consul the year Tusculum, according to Cicero the home town of the Fulvii, revolted against Rome; and on going over to the Romans he was made consul and triumphed over his own countrymen. Some records state that Fulvius and Fabius also warred against the Samnites, and triumphed over them; Livy, however, gives the credit to the dictator Aulus Cornelius Cossus Arvina. In 313 BC he was magister equitum to the dictator Lucius Aemilius Mamercinus, who led the siege of Saticula, which succeeded after the army drove off an attempt of the Samnites to relieve the city.

References 

4th-century BC Roman consuls
3rd-century BC Romans
4th-century BC births
3rd-century BC deaths
Ancient Roman dictators
Ancient Roman generals
Magistri equitum (Roman Republic)
Curvus, Lucius